Veredus Laboratories is a medical device company in Singapore that specializes in developing portable diagnostic tool kit.

In July 2005, Veredus Laboratories launched a DNA- and RNA-based diagnostic kits for dengue, avian influenza and malaria. The kit is based on technologies licensed from A*STAR and the National University of Singapore. 

In January 2006, Veredus Laboratories  and STMicroelectronics announced a joint effort in the development of a rapid diagnostic kit for avian influenza and other influenza viruses which could produces result within an hour, based on Lab-on-a-chip (LOC) technology. Later in July 2006, Veredus Laboratories set up an on-board avian influenza testing laboratories on USS Blue Ridge, the flagship of the United States 7th Fleet, and on aircraft carrier USS Kitty Hawk.

See also 

 ApiJect Systems
 OrCam device
 Vacuactivus
 Zephyr Surgical Implants

References

External links
Official Website
Electric Hospital Bed
Singapore-made Avian Flu Test Kit  (newsletter Dec05/Jan06), Singapore Embassy in Washington

Health care companies of Singapore
Nanotechnology companies
Medical device manufacturers